The Venezuelan poodle moth is an as-yet unidentified species of moth photographed in 2009 by Kyrgyzstani zoologist Dr. Arthur Anker in the Gran Sabana region of Venezuela. Anker initially captioned his photo as "Poodle moth, Venezuela", naming it after its resemblance to a poodle.

Classification 
Anker hypothesized it could be a member of the genus Artace, namely the species Artace cribraria. 

Dr. John E. Rawlins from the Carnegie Museum of Natural History concurred with the Artace classification:

The moth is often confused online with images of the domestic silk moth (Bombyx mori), which is native to China. Cryptozoologist Karl Shuker noted the Venezuelan poodle moth has a superficial resemblance to the muslin moth (Diaphora mendica), a tiger moth from Eurasia.

Measurements derived from Dr. Anker's photographs show the moth to be about 1 in (2.5 cm) in length. The unusual appearance and dearth of actual information on the moth has led to it being compared to famous animal hoaxes. Subsequent expeditions to the region have been unable to spot the moth again.

Habitat 
The photographs were taken in the in the Canaima National Park of Venezuela. The region includes diverse habitat types, including moist forest and high rock plateaus known as tepuis.

References

Lasiocampidae
Internet memes
Fauna of the Tepuis
Moths of South America